Son of the Devil may refer to:

People
 Şeytanoğlu ("Son of the Devil") (1510–1578), Ottoman Greek magnate
 El Hijo del Diablo ("The Son of the Devil") (born 1962), Mexican professional wrestler
 El Hijo del Demonio ("The Son of the Devil") (born 1989), nickname for Bestia 666, a Mexican professional wrestler

Arts and entertainment
Aaron, Son of the Devil, an anti-Semitic caricature
 Shaitan Ka Bachcha (Son of the Devil), an Indian Tamil film
 Sons of the devil, a comic book series